Ekemblemaria nigra, the Moth blenny, is a species of chaenopsid blenny found in coral reefs around Colombia and Panama, in the western Atlantic Ocean. It can reach a maximum length of  TL.

References
 Meek, S. E. and S. F. Hildebrand. 1928 (1 Sept.) The marine fishes of Panama. Part III. Field Museum of Natural History, Publications, Zoölogical Series v. 15 (publ. 249): xxv-xxxi + 709–1045, Pls. 72-102.

nigra
Fish described in 1928